The statue of Bedřich Smetana is a sculpture of the famous Czech composer Bedřich Smetana (1824–1884) located outside the Smetana Museum in Prague, Czech Republic. It was unveiled on 4 June 1984, in the centenary year of his death. The sculpture, 235 cm high and weighing about a ton, was by professor Josef Malejovský and architect Bedřich Hanák.

References

External links

 

Monuments and memorials in Prague
Outdoor sculptures in Prague
Sculptures of men in Prague
Statues in Prague
Old Town (Prague)
Statues of musicians